Lord Buddha Education Foundation (LBEF) is an IT college located at Maitidevi, Kathmandu, Nepal. It is affiliated under Asia Pacific University of Technology and Innovation (Malaysia) and these courses are recognised by Tribhuvan University of Nepal. Founded in 1998, the LBEF, a non-profit, non-government organization, has a well-established tradition of excellence across a broad range of academic disciplines. From its humble beginnings, the college has made steady progress and today stands as one of the leading colleges in Nepal with currently over 1,000 students. More than 10,000 students have over the years graduated from LBEF group of institutions and have established careers as bankers, IT experts, entrepreneurs, managers and leaders in their chosen area of interest. LBEF campus is known as the First IT college of Nepal.

Courses offered
Bachelor of Science in Information Technology
Master of Science in Information Technology Management 
MIT
MBA
BBA
BBM

Education in Kathmandu
1998 establishments in Nepal